Vikram-class offshore patrol vessel may refer to:

 , the offshore patrol vessel built for the Indian Coast Guard since 1980s
 , the offshore patrol vessel used by the Indian Coast Guard since 2018